Severn Lamb, sometimes known as Severn-Lamb, are manufacturers of various forms of transport systems and equipment, principally aimed at the leisure market. They are based at Alcester in the English county of Warwickshire, but sell their products worldwide. As of January 2023, the firm is managed by Severn Lamb's grandson and employs 30 people.

History 

The company was founded by Peter Severn Lamb in 1948 in Stratford-upon-Avon. In its early days it predominantly manufactured steam locomotives for model and miniature railways. Today it builds live steam and steam outline electric and diesel hydraulic locomotives for narrow gauge railways in theme parks and similar venues, together with road trains, monorails and various themed custom vehicles, including electric vehicles, buses, and boats.

Customers include Disney, with vehicles built for the Wildlife Express Train at Disney's Animal Kingdom in Walt Disney World Resort,  the Disneyland Railroad at Disneyland Paris, and the Hong Kong Disneyland Railroad at Hong Kong Disneyland. Vehicles have also been built for many other theme parks and resorts, including Busch Gardens Tampa in Florida, Mirabilandia in Italy, Kuwait Entertainment City in Kuwait, Genting Highlands in Malaysia, and Thorpe Park and Legoland Windsor in the United Kingdom.

Severn Lamb also built the 52 electrically powered platforms that provided the moving stage that encircled the perimeter of the arena for the opening and closing ceremonies of the 2004 Olympic Games in Athens.

In November 2022, it was announced Severn Lamb had acquired the US and global supplier of trams, Trams International.

Gallery

See also

List of locomotive builders

References

External links
Official Page

Companies based in Stratford-upon-Avon
Locomotive manufacturers of the United Kingdom
Manufacturing companies of the United Kingdom